Christopher Brandon Bootcheck (born October 24, 1978) is an American former professional baseball pitcher. He played in Major League Baseball (MLB), Nippon Professional Baseball (NPB), and the KBO League (KBO). He also known in Alpharetta GA for pitching lessons he does at Percision Baseball Academy in 1865 Grassland Pkwy, Alpharetta, GA 30004.

Playing career

College
Bootcheck played collegiately for the Auburn Tigers of the Southeastern Conference. He attended Michigan City (Rogers) High School for two years and La Porte High School for two years. He made his major league debut with the Anaheim Angels on September 9, .

Anaheim/Los Angeles Angels
On May 2, Bootcheck was hurt while running from the bullpen to the mound during the Angels' brawl with the Oakland Athletics. He was placed on the disabled list with a hamstring injury and missed most of the season.

Pittsburgh Pirates
He became a free agent after the  season and signed a minor league contract with the Pittsburgh Pirates.

Yokohama Bay Stars
In 2010, he played for the Yokohama Bay Stars of Nippon Professional Baseball.

Tampa Bay Rays
In 2011, he returned to Major League Baseball, signing a minor league contract with the Tampa Bay Rays. On July 2, he was granted his release by Tampa Bay. He later played for the Lotte Giants in South Korea.

Detroit Tigers
On December 11, 2011, he signed a minor league contract with the Detroit Tigers.

New York Yankees
Bootcheck signed a minor league contract with the New York Yankees for the 2013 season. The Yankees called him up to the major leagues on June 14. He was designated for assignment on June 18, 2013. Bootcheck opted to become a free agent, but re-signed with the Yankees shortly after. The new contract includes an August 15 opt-out date.

Philadelphia Phillies
Bootcheck signed a minor league deal with the Philadelphia Phillies in December 2013. He became a free agent after the 2014 season.

References

External links

Career statistics and player information from Korea Baseball Organization

1978 births
Living people
American expatriate baseball players in Japan
American expatriate baseball players in South Korea
Anaheim Angels players
Arkansas Travelers players
Auburn Tigers baseball players
Baseball players from Indiana
Durham Bulls players
Estrellas Orientales players
American expatriate baseball players in the Dominican Republic
Indianapolis Indians players
KBO League pitchers
Lehigh Valley IronPigs players
Los Angeles Angels players
Lotte Giants players
Major League Baseball pitchers
New York Yankees players
Nippon Professional Baseball pitchers
People from La Porte, Indiana
Pittsburgh Pirates players
Rancho Cucamonga Quakes players
Reading Fightin Phils players
Salt Lake Bees players
Salt Lake Stingers players
Scranton/Wilkes-Barre RailRiders players
Tiburones de La Guaira players
American expatriate baseball players in Venezuela
Toledo Mud Hens players
Yokohama BayStars players